Jiazhuan is a town in Bama Yao Autonomous County, Guangxi, China.

Administrative division
As of 2016, the town is divided into eleven villages: 
 Baima
 Lagao
 Jiazhuan
 Namen
 Songji
 Ping'an
 Poyue
 Minshan
 Renxiang
 Xingren
 Haohe

Geography
The town lies at the northwestern of Bama Yao Autonomous County, bordering Nashe Township to the west, Bama Town to the south, Fengshan County to the north, and Xishan Township to the east.

The Panyang River flows through the town northwest to southeast.

Economy
The region's economy is based on agriculture and tourism. Significant crops include grains, beans, and cassava.

Tourist attractions
The main attractions are the Baimo Cave and Bainiao Rock.

Transportation
The Provincial Highway S208 passes across the town northwest to southeast.

References

Bibliography
 

Towns of Hechi
Divisions of Bama Yao Autonomous County